The Santika Club fire occurred on Thursday 1 January 2009, in the Santika Club nightclub in Ekkamai, Watthana, Bangkok, Thailand, where New Year celebrations were taking place. A total of 66 people were killed and another 222 injured when fire swept through the nightclub during the New Year's celebration as a band, coincidentally called "Burn", was playing. By another coincidence, the party was named "Santika's Last Night". The fire broke out at 00:35. and citizens of thirteen countries were among the injured.

Fire
No official cause for the Santika fire has been announced by investigators. Suggested causes include outdoor fireworks that set the roof on fire, sparklers lighted inside the nightclub, or an electrical explosion. One witness stated there were no pyrotechnics in the club, while another reported seeing flames on the roof after going outside to watch the midnight fireworks display.

Video recordings of the indoor stage event, including the countdown to midnight, show that only ordinary holiday sparklers were used. Moreover, the fire became visible indoors approximately 10 minutes after midnight. This strongly suggests the fire originated inside the ceiling space or on the roof, allowing it to grow in intensity while going unnoticed for some time. Due to the lax enforcement of building regulations, tar paper and plastic are often used as waterproofing materials. Santika only had one main exit, with an additional private staff exit. A third exit was locked to prevent robberies.

Victims
Around 1,000 guests and employees were in the club when it burned, and deaths occurred from smoke inhalation, burns and being crushed during a stampede for the exit. Doctors stated that fumes from burning plastic could have caused people to faint after a few minutes.

The injured were taken to 19 hospitals, with most taken to Bangkok Hospital. More than 100 other people were injured in this incident. Only 29 of the 61 bodies were immediately identified, of these 28 were Thais and the other a Singaporean. The bodies of those who died were wrapped in white cloth and placed in the club's car park pending removal. It took up to a week to identify the others because of extensive burns to their bodies.

Investigations and criminal proceedings

Pongsak Kasemsan, an official in Bangkok, ordered a preliminary investigation, with results by 4 January. After a preliminary inspection of the club's safety system, it was declared "substandard" by police Lieut. Gen. Jongrak Jutanont. It was revealed the club only had one fire extinguisher, and that the nightclub was registered as a food vendor (restaurant), meaning it was required by law to close at midnight. Prime Minister Abhisit Vejjajiva visited the site and said, "The question is why they let someone take fireworks inside the pub and light them up."

Two parallel investigations were launched, one by the police, and one by the Ministry of Justice. The police blamed the lead singer of "Burn" for setting off fireworks on stage, and the club owner for recklessness and for illegally admitting people under the age of 19. The Ministry of Justice investigation discovered the nightclub was officially registered as a private residence and therefore had never received a fire safety inspection. It was also in a zone where nightclubs are prohibited and the city architect's signature approving the club's design had been forged. Between 2004 and 2006, police had filed 47 charges against the club's owners for illegal operation. After that, however, no charges were filed. Suspicions of corruption were raised when one of the co-owners was identified as a senior police officer. When the Ministry of Justice investigation was turned over to the police, sources close to the minister reported he was furious.

The owner of the Santika Club was charged, along with twelve other directors. The owner was also charged with allowing an underage customer into the club after a 17-year-old student's body was recovered. He faced a further charge of carelessness resulting in death.

On 20 September 2011, the Southern Bangkok Criminal Court found two persons – Wisuk Setsawat, the pub owner, and Boonchu Laorinath, the responsible person for pyrotechnics – guilty of negligence. Wisuk and Boonchoo were given three-year jail terms. Boonchoo was also ordered to pay 8.5 million baht in compensation to five plaintiffs, relatives of the victims.

On 22 October 2013, the Court of Appeals acquitted Setsawat of gross negligence. On 25 April 2014, the Southern Bangkok Criminal Court found Setsawat guilty of excise tax violations and sentenced him to one year in prison.

In November 2015, club owner Wisuk Setsawat was jailed for three years.

Aftermath 
The ruins of the club was promptly demolished and the site left vacant for over a decade, seeing brief use as a banana farm in 2020 before major redevelopment commenced in 2021. The @Ekkamai Lifestyle Mall currently occupies the site of the club.

In popular culture
Modernine TV discussed Santika Club fire in the TimeLine on 30 March 2015 titled "Countdown Death Santika".

References

External links

2009 fires in Asia
January 2009 events in Thailand
Concert disasters
Fire disasters involving barricaded escape routes
Fires in Thailand
Nightclub fires started by pyrotechnics
2009 disasters in Thailand